Carl Eiríksson (29 December 1929 – 12 June 2020) was an Icelandic sports shooter. He competed in the men's 50 metre rifle prone event at the 1992 Summer Olympics.

References

External links
 

1929 births
2020 deaths
Icelandic male sport shooters
Olympic shooters of Iceland
Shooters at the 1992 Summer Olympics
Place of birth missing